Loiron-Ruillé is a commune in the department of Mayenne, western France. The municipality was established on 1 January 2016 by merger of the former communes of Loiron and Ruillé-le-Gravelais.

See also 
Communes of the Mayenne department

References 

Communes of Mayenne
Populated places established in 2016
2016 establishments in France